Warra is a national park in New South Wales, Australia, 438 km north of Sydney.

The average elevation of the terrain is 3,773 ft.

See also
 Protected areas of New South Wales
 High Conservation Value Old Growth forest

References

National parks of New South Wales
Protected areas established in 1999
1999 establishments in Australia